Li Guojie (born 15 October 1985 in Chengdu, Sichuan) is a Chinese épée fencer, who competed at the 2008 Summer Olympics and the 2012 Summer Olympics.

At the 2008 Summer Olympics, he was part of the Chinese épée team that finished in 4th place, narrowly losing the semi-final to Poland 44-45, and the bronze medal match 35-45.

Major performances
2006 National Championships – 1st épée
2008 Asian Fencing Championships - 3rd épée
 2010 Asian Games (Guangzhou) – 2nd épée
 2011 Asian Fencing Championships - 3rd épée
 2012 Asian Fencing Championships - 3rd épée
 2013 Asian Fencing Championships - 3rd épée

See also
China at the 2008 Summer Olympics

References

1985 births
Living people
Chinese male épée fencers
Fencers at the 2008 Summer Olympics
Fencers at the 2012 Summer Olympics
Olympic fencers of China
Sportspeople from Chengdu
Asian Games medalists in fencing
Fencers at the 2010 Asian Games
Fencers at the 2014 Asian Games
Asian Games silver medalists for China
Asian Games bronze medalists for China
Medalists at the 2010 Asian Games
Fencers from Sichuan
21st-century Chinese people